Daniel "Hondo" Henderson was born January 4, 1965, in Boulder, Colorado. He is an American former ice sledge hockey player. He won a gold medal with Team USA at the 2002 Winter Paralympics. Dan had the lower part of his left leg amputated as a result of a car accident in 1972. He was introduced to the sport of sled hockey by teammate and friend, Dave Conklin in 1989. Dan was on the very first USA sled hockey team, and every USA team up until he retired after winning the gold in 2002. Dan also competed in the 1998 Paralympic games in Nagano, Japan. Dan is a pioneer of the sport in the United States.

References

Living people
1965 births
Paralympic sledge hockey players of the United States
American sledge hockey players
Paralympic gold medalists for the United States
Medalists at the 2002 Winter Paralympics
Paralympic medalists in sledge hockey
Ice sledge hockey players at the 2002 Winter Paralympics